Nayan Tara Das (born 1 January 1915, date of death unknown) was member of 1st Lok Sabha from Jamui (Lok Sabha constituency) in Bihar. He was born in Puranigunj, Monghyr.

He was elected to 2nd from Munger, 3rd and 4th Lok Sabha from Jamui.

References

1915 births
Year of death missing
India MPs 1952–1957
India MPs 1957–1962
India MPs 1962–1967
India MPs 1967–1970
Bihari politicians
People from Jamui district
People from Munger district